Tongoa may be:

Namakura language 
North Efate language 

Cf. Tangoa language